Ceroplesis rubrovariegata is a species of beetle in the family Cerambycidae. It was described by Per Olof Christopher Aurivillius in 1925 and is known from Kenya.

References

rubrovariegata
Beetles described in 1925